Project Pabst is a music festival that takes place in Portland, Oregon in the United States. The first two editions of the festival were held in September 2014 and July 2015. The festival is produced by Superfly and sponsored by both Pabst Brewing Company and StubHub.

Location and Format 

The Project Pabst festival takes place near the Ross Island Bridge on Portland's South Waterfront. The exact location is at 3030 SW Moody Ave, Portland, OR 97201.  There are two main stages on 10 acres in Portland's South Waterfront near the restored Zidell Yards. In 2015, the festival ran for two days on Saturday, July 18 and Sunday, July 19. For both the 2014 and the 2015 festival, the basic format of consisted of 8 bands each day spanned across the two stages, so 16 bands total.

Pabst encourages all attendees to walk, bike, or skate. Since Portland is very economically friendly parking is limited at the event. Project Pabst has a Park to Walk program where they have a parking garage specifically for the event you can pay to park and walk 1.2 miles to the event. They also have valet parking for bikes and skateboards only.

History 

Pabst Blue Ribbon beer was established in Milwaukee, Wisconsin in 1844, by a German immigrant, Jacob Bests. Throughout the years Pabst beer went through a decline in popularity and their sales were plummeting. However, Portland, Oregon played an integral part in bringing the American beer back to life. Since the 1970s, Pabst had seen a decline in their sales until the early 2000s, when their sales started going up again. Portland was sourced as being one of the main proponents of this change. Pabst became very popular due to its image as a cheap, working class, beer that did not try to buy their way with excessive advertisements.

In creating the Project Pabst festival, Pabst Brewing Company hoped for it to be a "love letter to Portland". In their initial ideas for the logo of the festival, they made the Portland's Old Town sign into their Project Pabst logo. Portland’s Old Town sign is an outline of the State of Oregon with “Portland, Oregon Old Town,” written in the middle. At the top of the sign, there is a giant deer jumping over the logo. The deer represents Oregon since deer live all over the state. Pabst liked the idea of the sign and made a similar one with the outline of the state of Oregon and their logo is “Project Pabst Portland Oregon.”  Instead of using the deer in the logo, though, they decided to make it a unicorn instead. That day, Pepper, the Pabst Blue Ribbon Unicorn was born. Portland’s city board was unsure of the logo though, and they ended up turning Pabst down and pushing the dates back of when they would accept it. There was some controversy behind this decision though and the rejected sign was still used throughout the 2014 Project Pabst festival.

Project Pabst Unicorn is a symbol Pabst Brewing Company created six weeks before the Project Pabst event. They had a huge team creating the 22 foot Unicorn, which stood at the center of the festival. PBR, Figure Plant, Superfly, and David Korins design all came up with the idea of having a unicorn and they helped design Pepper, the giant Unicorn statue, with a light up horn that lights up the colors of the rainbow. There's a myth in Portland that the city was built on a Unicorn burial site and that it used to be the “city of Unicorns.”

Lineup 

The headliners for the 2014 festival were Modest Mouse and Tears for Fears. For 2015, the main headlining bands were: Weezer, Against Me!, and Run the Jewels. The full lineup of bands for the 2015 show was:
 Blondie
 TV on the Radio
 Against Me!
 Run the Jewels
 Thee Oh Sees
 The Velvet Teen
 Priory
 Hustle and Drone
 Weezer
 Passion Pit
 Buzzcocks
 The Both (Aimee Man/ Ted Leo)
 Alvvays
 Terry and Louie
 Wampire
 Wild Ones

Night Shows 

Project Pabst 2015 also incorporated a handful of night shows at other venues in the Portland area to the festival. These shows ran at night from July 16–19, 2015 after the daytime festival had finished. These night shows and their venues included:

Crystal Ballroom 

Saturday - BadBadNotGood, Ghostface Killah, and Del the Funky Homosapien

Dante’s 

Friday - The Spits, The Epoxies, Long Knife

Saturday - Oblivians, Pure Country Gold, Bobby Peru

Sunday - The Mummies, Gaythiest, Sex Crime

Star Theater 

Friday - The Sonics, Pierced Arrows, Fireballs of Freedom

Saturday - Roky Erickson, The Pynnacles, Hollow Sidewalks

Revolution Hall 

Friday - Preservation Hall Jazz Band, Son Little

Saturday - Earth

Doug Fir 

Thursday - Brian Posehn, Bryan Cook, Sean Jordan

Friday - Shannon and the Clams, Chastity Belt, The Shivas

Saturday - Fernando, Jeremy Wilson, Mike Coykendall

Mississippi Studios 

Friday - Tacocat, The Ghost Ease, Shadowlands

Saturday - The Coathangers,  Is/Is, Marriage + Cancer

Ash St. Saloon 

Friday - Jex Thoth, Ides of Gemini, Clay Rendering, Barrowlands

Saturday - Subrosa, Brothers of the Sonic Cloth, Lesbian, Eight Bells

Bunk Bar 

Friday - Chrome

Activities 
Aside from the live bands, there are a number of entertainment activities set up on the festival grounds. These activities are open to any and all people attending the Project Pabst festival.

PBRcade 

In an attempt to emulate the bar-like atmosphere in which Pabst has built their empire, a small bar is set up on the festival grounds for attendees to take a break in. The bar houses pinball machines, arcade games, and local music. All games are completely free to play.

Pabst VANdalism 

The Pabst Van is set up on the festival premises and is treated as a communal art piece. Festival attendees are encouraged to use spray paint to decorate the van in whatever manner they please.

Pabst Wax 

In this small recording booth, attendees can jump in and create their own music. These recording are then cut directly into vinyl and people can walk away with their own record demo.

#NoMoFoMo 
This booth stands for No More Fear of Missing Out. In it, there is a live DJ booth set up where festival attendees can watch and listen to performances as well as connect with social media. This booth is sponsored by StubHub.

Food 

Local food vendors at the festival include: Atlas Pizza, Boke Bowl, Fifty Licks Ice Cream, Olympic Provisions and Slowburger.

Reception 
Project Pabst was received well amongst fans and deemed a complete success in the eyes of Pabst Brewing Company. Despite temperatures around 100 degrees for the 2015 edition, 15,000 fans attended over the two-day festival. Weezer, Against Me!, Blondie, and Run The Jewels were the biggest crowd-pleasers of the 2015 lineup. The amount of activities to partake in throughout the festival was also a main point of praise. With the temperatures so hot, Project Pabst’s decision to allow sealed water bottles to be brought into the festival, as well as the inclusion of on-site refills, was something fans were very thankful for. Especially since limiting water and inflating prices on water is something that is done often at festivals. In 2014, the average cost of a bottle of water at festivals was $4 and the average cost of a beer was $8.50. 16oz Tallboys of Pabst Blue Ribbon only cost $4 at the Project Pabst, which is more than you’d pay at a bar, but less than half of what most festivals would charge. Overall, it seems Project Pabst has been very successful and well received.

Impact 
Project Pabst was produced by the relatively new festival producer, Superfly. Superfly co-produced the most recent Bonnaroo and Outside Lands festivals. Pabst Brewing Company was only expecting 10,000 attendees over the two-day Project Pabst festival and instead, ended up getting 15,000. For such a small, indie brewing company, having their own festival is a big step. The festival ended up costing around 12 percent of their annual marketing budget. As a result, Pabst Brewing Company saw an increase of 25,000 cases of Pabst sold this year in the Portland market.

References

External links
Official website

2014 establishments in Oregon
Festivals in Portland, Oregon
Music festivals in Oregon